The 1974–75 Scottish Cup was the 90th season of Scotland's most prestigious football knockout competition. The Cup was won by Celtic who defeated Airdrieonians in the final.

First round

Replays

Second round

Replay

Third round

Replays

Fourth round

Quarter-finals

Replays

Semi-finals

Replay

Final

See also

1974–75 in Scottish football
1974–75 Scottish League Cup

Scottish Cup seasons
1974–75 in Scottish football
Scot